The list of ship launches in 1873 includes a chronological list of some ships launched in 1873.


References

Sources

1873
Ship launches